Bernburg was a Verwaltungsgemeinschaft ("collective municipality") in the Salzlandkreis district, in Saxony-Anhalt, Germany. The seat of the Verwaltungsgemeinschaft was in Bernburg. It was disbanded on 1 January 2010.

The Verwaltungsgemeinschaft Bernburg consisted of the following municipalities:

 Bernburg
 Gröna

References

Former Verwaltungsgemeinschaften in Saxony-Anhalt